Wasserkraftwerke im Zillertal is a series of hydroelectric power plants in the Zillertal region of Tyrol, Austria.

References

Hydroelectric power stations in Austria
Economy of Tyrol (state)